The 1991 Vuelta a Andalucía was the 37th edition of the Vuelta a Andalucía cycle race and was held on 5 February to 10 February 1991. The race started in Chiclana and finished in Granada. The race was won by Roberto Lezaun.

General classification

References

Vuelta a Andalucia
February 1991 sports events in Europe
Vuelta a Andalucía by year
1991 in Spanish sport